is a novel by Toyoko Yamasaki. It has been adapted into a movie in 1976 and then twice as a television mini-series in 1979 and 2009.

Relationship with actual events
The main character Tadashi Iki is widely seen as based on the real life Ryuzo Sejima
However, in the work, Iki finally hits big success in oil business, whilst the actual Sejima attempts in the field ended as a major failure.

1976 film 

 is a 1976 Japanese film directed by Satsuo Yamamoto.

Cast
Tatsuya Nakadai - Tadashi Iki
Tetsurō Tamba - Isao Kawamata
Isao Yamagata - Ichizo Daimon
Jūkei Fujioka - Army Chief General of Kwantung Army
Kin'ya Kitaōji
Takashi Yamaguchi
Kaoru Yachigusa
Shiho Fujimura
Ichirō Nakatani
Hisashi Igawa
Eitaro Ozawa
Etsushi Takahashi - Detective
Jirō Tamiya - Tatsuzo Samejima
Hideji Ōtaki - Seizo Hisamatsu

Awards
1st Hochi Film Award
Won: Best Supporting Actor - Hideji Ōtaki

31st Mainichi Film Award
Won: Best Film
Won: Best Screenplay : Noboru Yamada

1979 TV series

Cast
Mikijirō Hira - Tadashi Iki
Tomisaburo Wakayama - Ichizo Daimon
Atsuo Nakamura - Tatsuzo Samejima
Hideo Takamatsu - Tatsuya Satoi
Kimiko Ikegami - Naoko Iki
Takashi Shimura - Masaharu Tanigawa
Kō Nishimura - Seizo Hisamatsu
Tamao Nakamura
Ayumi Ishida
Ichirō Murakoshi - Narrator

2009 TV series

Cast
Toshiaki Karasawa - Tadashi Iki
Yoshio Harada - Ichizo Daimon
Kenichi Endō - Tatsuzo Samejima
Ittoku Kishibe - Tatsuya Satoi
Toshirō Yanagiba - Isao Kawamata
Emi Wakui - Yoshiko Iki
Koyuki - Chisato Akitsu
Nicholas Pettas - Pratt
Mikako Tabe - Naoko Iki
Sheryar Khan - Oil Company Manager
Issei Futamata - Narrator

References

External links
 

1976 novels
1976 films
1979 Japanese television series debuts
1979 Japanese television series endings
2009 Japanese television series debuts
2010 Japanese television series endings
Films based on Japanese novels
Films directed by Satsuo Yamamoto
Japanese drama television series
Japanese television miniseries
1970s Japanese-language films
Japanese novels adapted into films
Television shows set in Japan
Television shows set in Russia
Fuji TV dramas
Television shows based on Japanese novels
1970s Japanese films